The Kota Bridge, Kota Tinggi or Jambatan Kota, Kota Tinggi (Jawi: جمبتن كوتا، كوتا تيڠڬي) is the main bridge on Johor River in Kota Tinggi, Johor, Malaysia. It is located at Johor Bahru-Kota Tinggi Highway (Federal Route 3). It was the earliest bridge built in the town. Previously it was a wooden bridge. Then on 1962 the wooden bridge was replaced by the concrete bridge on 1963 and the bridge was officially opened by the Works Minister at that time Tun VT Sambanthan.

See also
 Transport in Malaysia

Bridges in Johor
Kota Tinggi District